Jasenak may refer to:

 Jasenak, Serbia, a village near Obrenovac
 Jasenak, Croatia, a village near Ogulin